The Supreme Soviet of the Union of Soviet Socialist Republics was, beginning in 1936, the most authoritative legislative body of the Union of Soviet Socialist Republics (USSR), and the only one with the power to approve constitutional amendments. Prior to 1936, the Congress of Soviets was the supreme legislative body. During 1989–1991 a similar, but not identical structure was the supreme legislative body. The Supreme Soviet elected the USSR's collective head of state, the Presidium; and appointed the Council of Ministers, the Supreme Court, and the Procurator General of the USSR.

By the Soviet constitutions of 1936 and 1977, the Supreme Soviet was defined as the highest organ of state power in the Soviet Union and was imbued with great lawmaking powers. In practice, however, it was a pseudo-parliament that did little more than rubber-stamp decisions already made by the USSR's executive organs and the CPSU — always by unanimous consent — and listen to the General Secretary's speeches. This was in accordance with the Stalinist CPSU's principle of democratic centralism and became the norm for other Communist legislatures.

Structure

The Supreme Soviet was composed of two chambers, each with equal legislative powers, with members elected for four-year terms:

The Soviet of the Union, elected on the basis of the population with one deputy for every 300,000 people in the Soviet federation.
The Soviet of Nationalities, which represented the ethnic populations as units, with members elected on the basis of 32 deputies from each union republic, 11 from each autonomous republic, five from each autonomous oblast (region), and one from each autonomous okrug (district). The administrative units of the same type would send the same number of members regardless of their size or population.

The Supreme Soviet convened twice a year, usually for less than a week. For the rest of the year, the Presidium performed its ordinary functions. Often, the CPSU bypassed the Supreme Soviet altogether and had major laws enacted as Presidium decrees. Nominally, if such decrees were not ratified by the Supreme Soviet at its next session, they were considered revoked. In practice, however, the principle of democratic centralism rendered the process of ratifying Presidium decrees a mere formality. In some cases, even this formality was not observed.

After 1989 it consisted of 542 deputies (divided into two 271 chambers) decreased from a previous 1,500. The meetings of the body were also more frequent, from six to eight months a year. In September 1991, after the August Coup, it was reorganised into the Soviet (council) of Republics and the Soviet of The Union, which would jointly amend the Soviet Constitution, admit new states, hear out the President of the Soviet Union on important home and foreign policy issues, approve the union budget, declare war and conclude peace. The Soviet of Republics would consist of 20 deputies from each union republic, plus one deputy to represent each autonomous region of each republic, delegated by the republics' legislatures. Russia was an exception with 52 deputies. The Soviet Union consisted of deputies apportioned by the existing quotas.

In 1989, its powers were: 
 Passing and initiating laws.
 Submitting questions to the President of the Soviet Union, the Council of Ministers of the Soviet Union, scheduling elections of deputies. 
 Convening the Congress of People's Deputies.
 Appointing the Chairman of the Council of Ministers on the submission of the president.
 Ratifying the composition of the Council of Ministers and changes in it on the submission on the Chairman. 
 Forming and disbanding ministries and state committees on the Council of Ministers proposal.
 Overriding a presidential veto with a two-thirds majority. 
 Ratifying presidential declarations of war.
 Impeaching the President.
 Hearing reports by organs of appointed officials.
 Implementing laws regulating property, management of the economy, social and cultural issues, budget and finance, salaries, prices, taxes, environmental protection, natural resource, and civil rights, 
 Laying down the principals of local and republic state power and the legal status of social organisations, 
 Submitting for ratification (and ratifying and amending) by the congress long-term national and social and economic development plans, the national budget, monitoring implantation of the state plan and budget, and ratifying reports on their performance.
 Ratifying international treaties.
 Overseeing the granting of foreign aid and negotiating foreign loans.
 Determining basic measures for national security, including declarations of war, mobilizing troops, and meeting international treaty obligations.

Acts by the Supreme Soviet entered into force after signature by the President and publication.

Between 1938 and February 1990, more than 50 years, only 80 laws were passed by the Supreme Soviet, less than 1% of total legislative acts.

Leaders

Chairman of the Presidium of the Supreme Soviet (1938–1989)

Chairmen of the Supreme Soviet (1989–1991)

Convocations
 1st convocation session 1938–1946, World War II
 2nd convocation session 1946–1950
 3rd convocation session 1950–1954
 4th convocation session 1954–1958
 5th convocation session 1958–1962
 6th convocation session 1962–1966
 7th convocation session 1966–1970
 8th convocation session 1970–1974
 9th convocation session 1974–1979
 10th convocation session 1979–1984
 11th convocation session 1984–1989
 1st convocation 1989–1991 (unofficially 12th convocation), sessions were conducted in the form of Congress of People's Deputies of the Soviet Union
 New composition 1991, (unofficially 13th convocation) unlike previous convocations, there were no elections for the new composition of the Supreme Council instead members of the council were delegated from the council of union republics that continued to be members of the Soviet Union.

Supreme Soviets of union and autonomous republics
Beside the Supreme Soviet of the Soviet Union, each of its constituting union republics and each autonomous republic had a supreme soviet. These supreme soviets also had presidiums, but all consisted of only one chamber. After the dissolution of the Soviet Union, some soviets of the succeeded independent republics simply changed their name to their more historic name or to emphasise their importance as a national parliament, while others changed to double-chamber assemblies.

Supreme soviets of union republics

Supreme councils of autonomous republic
List of known autonomous republics councils:

See also
 All-Russian Central Executive Committee
 Supreme Soviet of Russia
 Federal Assembly of Russia
 National People's Congress – Chinese equivalent
 Supreme People's Assembly – North Korean equivalent
 National Assembly of People's Power – Cuban equivalent
 National Assembly (Laos) – Laotian equivalent
 National Assembly (Vietnam) – Vietnamese equivalent
 Volkskammer – East German equivalent
 Federal Assembly – Czechoslovak equivalent

References

Further reading

External links
Electoral law of 1937

 
Government of the Soviet Union
Defunct bicameral legislatures
1938 establishments in the Soviet Union
1991 disestablishments in the Soviet Union